Weidner Communications Inc. was founded by Stephen Weidner in 1977 and marketed the Weidner Multi-Lingual Word Processing System.

History
In conjunction with its introduction to the market, the Weidner Multi-Lingual Word Processing System was first reported on in 1978 in the Wall Street Journal as “Quadrupling Translation Volume” and the Deseret News as “halving translation costs and of increasing output by at least 400 percent.”

This new technology was demonstrated to translation experts on September 12, 1978, at Brigham Young University in Provo, Utah. Thomas Bauman and Leland Wright of the American Translators Association who had arrived on September 11, 1978, in Provo, Utah to view a demonstration of the Weidner Multi-Lingual Word Processing System.  After attending the demonstration Thomas Bauman said, “I’ve never been so converted to anything so fast in my life.” He subsequently extended an invitation for Wydner to attend the annual meeting of the American Translators Association that following October where the Weidner Machine Translation System hailed a hoped-for breakthrough in machine translation. (Geoffrey Kingscott, 1992)

The Weidner "Multi-Lingual Word Processing System" is based on the research and work of Bruce Wydner, as demonstrated in his copyrighted text books.  The Fastest Way To Learn Spanish Is To See IT! (Learn to read Spanish in 24 hours) ©1971 and 1975. This technology is the basis of the Weidner Multi-Lingual Word Processing System, and was programmed for processing human languages on the low-cost computers of the late 1970s and as part of machine translation and word processing software today.

The Weidner Engine works by mapping the approximately 460,000 words in the English Dictionary (as in other target languages) to 10,000 "Root" words/thoughts (an Interlingual Lexicon).  Additionally, inflected, conjugated word changes and endings are automatically parsed from the root words by a parsing engine, then associated to a specific word type by language rules based on the sense of sight.  Each word (or expression) is parsed, compared to the spell-check lexicon and mapped to the interlingual lexicon for subsequent translation to the target language.  If the target language is the same as the inputted language the language rules result is a word processed document in the original language.  Tools included an aid for spelling and alternate word look-up.

Translated experts at the Commission of the European Union, said that this (to them) "new translation system" of Bruce Wydner "renewed" their "hope" for Machine Translation that would lead them to "Better Translation for Better Communication." (G. Van Slype, 1983)

Translation Associates and Eyring Research Institute

The company responsible for the production of the Weidner Multi-Lingual Word Processing System included Bruce Wydner and his friends (Warren Davidson, Dale Miller, and Lowell Randall) who formed, the Inns of the Temple, Inc., a 501(c)3 Corporation, dba Translation Associates.

Bruce Wydner (who legally had his last name changed to be pronounced properly), representing his company, made an exclusive marketing contract with his brother Stephen Weidner, the contract restricted the transfer of any development rights to his brother's company, and Bruce Wydner made a 15-year non-compete non-circumvent contract with Eyring Research Institute in Provo, Utah to engage their computing services in the creation of the Weidner Multi-lingual Word Processor, and for the programming skills of Eyring's bi-lingual programmer employee Bruce Bastian, Bruce Wydner paid Eyring Research Institute $25.00/hr for programming time of which $5.00/hr went to pay Bastian.

Machine translation

In 1982 Stephen Weidner began to have financial problems over a Research and Development Tax Shelter he had created, as a result Weidner Communications Inc. suffered, disputes over Weidner's assets were taken to court. In 1984 Stephen Weidner's original Company was purchased by Bravis International, one of Japan's largest translation companies, as part of a settlement of the court ordered liquidation of Weidner Communication's assets, but Weidner Communications Inc. still maintained offices in Chicago and in Paris.  During the mid-1980s Weidner Communications, Inc., (WCC), was the largest translation company by sales volume in the United States. (Margaret M. Perscheid, 1985) Later the Japanese sold Wydner's technology to Intergraph Corporation of Alabama who later sold it to Transparent Language, Inc. of New Hampshire.

Bruce Wydner, the principal agent for the Inns of the Temple Inc., that retained the research and development rights to the Weidner Multi-lingual Word Processor, separated himself from his brother in early 1979 and no longer supplied any updated software developments. Weidner had offended his brother over a matter of having Eyring Research Institute send their bi-lingual employee to remove Wydners intellectual property from his home, of which Wydner claims was stolen from him. (Wydner vs Novell, WordPerfect, Ashton, Bastan, et al., 2003)

SDL International, Enterprise Translation Server
The Weidner Engine is the basis of the website freetranslation.com.

The original Weidner Engine was recently (2001) bought by SDL International of London, England.

Lionbridge, iTranslator
A copy of the Weidner Multi-Lingual Word Processing software was requested by the German Government for the Siemens Corporation of Germany in September 1980 and was nicknamed the Siemens-Weidner Engine (originally English-German).  This revolutionary multi-lingual word processing engine became foundational in the development of the Metal MT project according to John White of the Siemens Corporation.  (The Deseret News, Friday, Aug.  22, 1980.)

After the Metal MT development Rights to the Siemens-Weidner Engine were sold to a Belgium company, Lernout & Hauspie.

The Siemens copy of the Weidner Multi-lingual Word Processing software has since been acquired through the purchase of assets of Lernout & Hauspie by Bowne Global Solutions, Inc., which was later acquired by Lionbridge Technologies, Inc. and is demonstrated in their itranslator software.

Word Processing

Microsoft Word
Lernout & Hauspie sold a copy of Wydner's language technology (The Siemens/Weidner Engine) aka Lernout and Hauspie Speech Products N.V. to the Microsoft Corporation to be used in Microsoft Word.

WordPerfect
Eyring Research Institute was a development bed to Bruce Bastian (co-founder of WordPerfect) who was one of the original programmer helpers for Bruce Wydner in the production of the original Weidner Spanish-English Multi-lingual Word Processor, a foundation to the Wordperfect Mono-lingual Word Processor, produced first for English then for Spanish.  (Utah Weekly, 2003)

Ronald G.  Hansen, the President of the Eyring Research Institute, reportedly asked Bruce Wydner the following in 1978: "Bruce Bastian says that this Multilingual Wordprocessor of yours has a lot more uses than just translating languages.  He says that it could be used to produce monolingual word processors and wants to know if you will let him do that." (Utah Weekly, 2003)

Alan Ashton said that, “Bruce Bastian did all of the formatting of the Word Processor Program, the main part of the Program that makes it work so well." That Format was expressed in that 1989 WordPerfect Users Manual as, "If you want to compose the Rules to process all of the words in a language, you must start with the Rules to process the most-used words."

Intelligent Systems Technology (ARPA) and (SISTO)
Eyring Research Institute was instrumental to the U.S. Air Force Missile Directorate at Hill Air Force Base near Ogden, Utah to produce in top military secrecy, the Intelligent Systems Technology Software that was foundational to the later named Reagan Star Wars program.

After the ALPAC Report in 1966, President David O. McKay of the LDS Church, apparently, approached one US Government operation  that continued seeking the technological advances in Human Language Technology, the Missile Directorate of the US Air Force, at Hill Air Force Base, to fund the transfer, in Top Military Secrecy, of any such technological advances, from the BYU Linguistics Department's Project to ERI facilities, in order for it to try to take any Human Language Technology from there to make it, through collaboration with the US Defense Department's Advanced Research Projects Agency (ARPA) and its Software and Intelligent Systems Technology Office (SISTO), into Missile Guidance Software that would be superior to any producible by the Soviet Union. (Cleo Harmon, 1999)

References

Sources

 Natural Language Computing: The commercial applications, Tim Johnson, Published by Ovum Ltd, London, 1985 
 A survey of the translation market, present and future, prepared for the Commission of the European Communities, Directorate-General Information Market and Innovation by Bureau Marcel van Dijk, Brussels PA Conseiller de Direction, Paris, Authors G. Van Slype (Bureau Marcel van Dijk) J. F. Guinet (PA) F. Seitz (PA) E. Benegam (PACTEL) 1983 ECSC, EEC EAEC Luxembourg, EUR 7720EN,
 A lunch with Bruce Wydner, Geoffrey Kingscott, Language International, John Benjamins Publishing Co., Amsterdam - The Netherlands, 4/4, April, 1992 http://www.mt-archive.info/jnl/LangInt-1992-Wydner.pdf
 The Life of Frank Carlyle Harmon (1905–1997), Compiled by his wife, Cleo Harman Edited by Bliss J. Hansen, Published by Family Footprints, 1999, p. 150 ASIN: B000I8VR9C
 California Firm to Unveil a Computer That Processes Words for Translators, Richard A. Shaffer, Wall Street Journal, October 24, 1978
 Provo researchers help perfect a computer-translator, Arnold Irving, The Deseret News, Oct. 31, 1978
 Germans visit Utah to see language translation unit, Richard Nash, The Deseret News, Aug. 21, 1980
 Machine Translation: its History, Current Status, and Future Prospects, Jonathan Slocum, Siemens Communications Systems, Inc., Linguistics Research Center, University of Texas, Austin, Texas, 1984, http://acl.ldc.upenn.edu/P/P84/P84-1116.pdf
 The Fastest Way to Learn Spanish is to See IT!, by Spanish New Learning Center, Hawkes Publishing Inc., 1975, 
 Wydner vs Novell, WordPerfect, Ashton, Bastan, et al., 2003
 Twenty years of Translating and the Computer, John Hutchins, 1998 http://www.hutchinsweb.me.uk/Aslib-1998.pdf
 Practical Experience of Machine Translation, Veronica Lawson, North Holland Publishing Company, Amsterdam, The Netherlands 1982
 Machine Translation Today; The State of the Art, Margaret King, Edinburgh University Press, Edinburgh, Scotland 1984
 Machine Translation; Past, Present, Future, W. J. Hutchins, Ellis Norwood Limited, Chichester, England, 1986
 Machine Translation, Ian Pigott, Commission of the European Communities, Luxemburg, XIII-84 IP, November 1991.
 Language Software and Technology, Report by Michael Quinlan, President of Transparent Language to LDS Church, New Hampshire, www.transparent.com, March 8, 2000
 COMPUTER-AIDED TRANSLATION AT WCC, Margaret M. Perscheid, CALICO Journal, Volume 3 Number 1, https://calico.org/a-273-ComputerAided%20Translation%20At%20WCC.html
 Analyse des Systems zur computergestützten Übersetzung Weidner – Version Französisch-Englisch 2.5, http://www.dialog-translations.com/bilder/Diplomarbeit%20Hans%20Christian%20von%20Steuber.pdf
 Michael G. Hundt: Working with the Weidner machine-aided translation system, in: Veronica Lawson (Hg): Translating and the computer 4 - Practical experience with machine translation, London, 1982
 Trial of the Weidner computer-assisted translation system, Translation Bureau Canada, Project No. 5-5462, 1985
 Wydner Invention Fulfills "Prophecy" of LDS "Mormon" Church Presidents, by US-Oregon Observer staff Special to the Utah Weekly, The Utah Weekly, Thursday, March 27, 2003, Vol. 2, Num. 4
 WCC's translation bureau, Henrietta Pons, Veronica Lawson 1982
 Ulla Magnusson-Murray: Operational experience of a machine translation service, in Veronica Lawson (Hg): Translating and the computer 5 - Tools for the trade, London 1983, S.171-180; Tim Johnson ebd:283-286
 Machine Translation: its History, Current Status, and Future Prospects, Jonathan Slocum, Siemens Communications Systems, Inc., Linguistics Research Center, University of Texas, Austin, Texas

Machine translation